C12orf24 (Chromosome 12, Open Reading Frame 24)  is a gene in humans (Homo sapiens) that encodes a protein known as FAM216A. This gene is primarily expressed in the testis and brain, but has constitutive expression in 25 other tissues. FAM216A is an intracellular protein that has been predicted to reside within the nucleus of cells. The exact function of C12orf24 is unknown. FAM216A is highly expressed in Sertoli cells of the testis as well as different stage spermatids.

Gene

Locus 
C12orf24 is a protein-encoding gene found on the forward strand of chromosome 12 at the locus 12q24.11. C12orf24 is located on the long arm of chromosome 12.

mRNA 
FAM216A has 2 isoforms X1 and X2 that are both shorter than the main protein, which is known as FAM216A. Isoform X2 has 2 variants which are the same length and isoform X1 only has 1 variant.

Size 
Chromosome 12 is a medium-sized chromosome, on which C12orf24 spans from 110,468,415 to 110,490,387 which is 21,973 bases long. The resulting mRNA transcript is 1,101 bases, 822 of which is the coding sequence. The resulting protein is 273 amino acids long.

Expression 
C12orf24 is primarily expressed in the brain, spinal cord, and testis of humans. Within the testis C12orf24 is expressed in Sertoli cells. Within the brain C12orf24 is expressed within neuropils.

Gene Regulation

Promoter 
According to the UCSC Genome Browser and Genomatix Eldorado there are two promoters of C12orf24 and no enhancers or other regulatory elements. Only one of the two predicted promoters binds transcription factors.

Transcription Factors 
There are many transcription factors predicted to bind to the promoter region of C12orf24 by Genomatix and the UCSC Genome Browser.

Protein

Cellular Location 
According to the PSORT program of Genescript, C12orf24 is 69.6% likely to be a nuclear protein. NCBI Gene predicts that C12orf24 is an intracellular protein.

Structure 
Protein FAM261A has 2 charge runs, a positive run from amino acids 200-229 and a negative charge run from amino acids 238–268. Methionine, histidine, and serine are all seen at a higher than expected rate in FAM216A while valine is seen at a significantly lower than expected rate.

The CFSSP (Chou and Fassman Secondary Structure Prediction Server) predicts a secondary structure for FAM216A that has multiple alpha helices with a few large beta pleated sheets. I-TASSER structure prediction program shows a 3D structure of FAM216A that has many alpha helices and a few coil turns with no beta pleated sheets.

Protein Level Regulation 
There are 8 predicted sites of sumoylation on FAM216A, with only 2 of them having a high probability of occurrence. There are 7 predicted sites of glycation on FAM216A. There is no predicted signal peptide for FAM216A, which may prevent the protein from being glycosylated. There is 42 predicted sites for phosphorylation, however given the predicted structure of the protein not all 42 sites will be accessible for phosphorylation.

Interacting Proteins 
There are only a few known proteins that are predicted to interact with FAM216A.

Homology

Paralogs 
The only paralog for FAM216A is FAM216B.

Orthologs 
According to the NCBI Gene page for C12orf24, there are at least 182 organisms with an ortholog of C12orf24. The farthest back known orthologs are in sea corals which diverged from humans 824 million years ago.

References 

Genes on human chromosome 12